Adam Botek (born 5 March 1997) is a Slovak sprint canoeist who competed at the 2020 Summer
Olympics.

He won a medal at the 2019 ICF Canoe Sprint World Championships.

References

External links

1997 births
Living people
Sportspeople from Komárno
ICF Canoe Sprint World Championships medalists in kayak
Slovak male canoeists
European Games medalists in canoeing
European Games bronze medalists for Slovakia
Canoeists at the 2019 European Games
Hungarians in Slovakia
Olympic canoeists of Slovakia
Canoeists at the 2020 Summer Olympics
Medalists at the 2020 Summer Olympics
Olympic medalists in canoeing
Olympic bronze medalists for Slovakia